Abdullah was a metal band formed in 1998 by Jeff Shirilla (drums/vocals) who was quickly joined by Al Seibert on guitar, the group released the EP Snake Lore in 1999 on their own label, Rage of Achilles Records, followed soon after by their self-titled album through MeteorCity Records in 2000.

Abdullah played their last show together on January 17, 2009 after announcing that they would be going on extended hiatus to allow Jeff Shirilla to concentrate on a new project This is Antarctica.

Band members 
Former
 Jeff Shirilla – lead vocals, drums
 Al Seibert – guitar
 Steven Bateman
 John Stepp
 Aaron Dallison
 Ed Emilich
 Ed Stephens
 Jameson Walters
 Jim Simonian
 Kevin Latchaw
 Josh Adkins

Discography
Snake Lore EP (1999) – Rage of Achilles
Abdullah (2000) – Meteor City
Graveyard Poetry (2002) – Meteor City
 Abdullah / Dragonauta split (2005) – Dias de Garage Records
Worship EP, (2005)

References

Musical groups established in 1998
Musical groups from Ohio
1998 establishments in Ohio